Chan Chong Ming  (born 16 February 1980) is a former Malaysian badminton player and a current head coach of Malaysian national women's doubles squad.

Career
Chan competed in badminton at the 2004 Summer Olympics with his then partner, Chew Choon Eng. In the first round, they defeated Theodoros Velkos and George Patis of Greece, but were then defeated in the round of 16 by Zheng Bo and Sang Yang of the China.

After his unsuccessful outing in the Olympic Games, Chan's regular doubles partner was changed to Koo Kien Keat. Together, they claimed 2005 Denmark Open title. Chan Chong Ming and Koo Kien Keat won the Malaysia Open in 2006 which was held in Kuching, Sarawak and became the new hope for Malaysia in men's doubles. However, at the XV World Championships in 2006, they conceded a walkover due to Chan's father's death. In the Swiss Open, Chan and Koo defeated Carsten Mogensen and Mathias Boe in a thrilling 17–14, 8-15, and 17–14 final match. On the run up to the Doha Asian Games XV, Chan sustained an injury which prompted their coach, Rexy Mainaky, to split them, partnering Koo Kien Keat with Tan Boon Heong for the games instead. Chan and Koo's partnership ended when Koo won the title with his new partner.

Chan's partner was changed to Hoon Thien How who was Tan Boon Heong's ex-partner. Chan and Hoon won the Kuala Lumpur Open at the end of 2006. Chan and Hoon Thien How won their first title in New Zealand after beating Johan Wiratama and Albertus Njoto of Hong Kong.

Chan paired again with Chew. In the late 2008, Chan established a company named Pioneer Sdn Bhd with Wong Choong Hann, Choong Tan Fook, Lee Wan Wah and Chew Choon Eng. They trained young players in the two centres in Kota Damansara and Bandar Mahkota Cheras. Chan married Janice Lee on 6 January 2008.

Achievements

World Championships 
Men's doubles

Asian Games 
Men's doubles

Asian Championships 
Men's doubles

Southeast Asian Games 
Men's doubles

Commonwealth Games 
Men's doubles

World Junior Championships 
Boys' doubles

Mixed doubles

Asian Junior Championships 
Boys' doubles

Mixed doubles

IBF World Grand Prix 
The World Badminton Grand Prix sanctioned by International Badminton Federation (IBF) since 1983 to 2006. The BWF Grand Prix has two levels, the Grand Prix Gold and Grand Prix. It is a series of badminton tournaments, sanctioned by the Badminton World Federation (BWF) from 2007 to 2017.

Men's doubles

Mixed doubles

  BWF Grand Prix Gold Tournament
  IBF & BWF Grand Prix tournament

Honour 
  :
  Member of the Order of the Defender of the Realm (A.M.N.) (2006)

References

External links
 
 
 
 
 

1980 births
Living people
People from Selangor
Malaysian sportspeople of Chinese descent
Malaysian male badminton players
Badminton players at the 2004 Summer Olympics
Olympic badminton players of Malaysia
Badminton players at the 1998 Asian Games
Badminton players at the 2002 Asian Games
Asian Games bronze medalists for Malaysia
Asian Games medalists in badminton
Medalists at the 1998 Asian Games
Medalists at the 2002 Asian Games
Badminton players at the 2002 Commonwealth Games
Badminton players at the 2006 Commonwealth Games
Commonwealth Games gold medallists for Malaysia
Commonwealth Games medallists in badminton
Competitors at the 2001 Southeast Asian Games
Competitors at the 2005 Southeast Asian Games
Southeast Asian Games gold medalists for Malaysia
Southeast Asian Games bronze medalists for Malaysia
Southeast Asian Games medalists in badminton
World No. 1 badminton players
Badminton coaches
Members of the Order of the Defender of the Realm
Medallists at the 2002 Commonwealth Games
Medallists at the 2006 Commonwealth Games